August Snieders (Bladel, 8 May 1825 – Brussels, 19 November 1904) was a Flemish journalist and writer. He started his career in 's-Hertogenbosch, but later moved to Antwerp. In 1845, he became editor of the newspaper Het Handelsblad, of which he was head editor from 1849 until 1899. Under his management Het Handelsblad became the most important Flemish newspaper and he himself the most authoritative Flemish journalist of the nineteenth century. He was a sound supporter of the catholic and Flemish ideals in Belgium. He was a brother of Jan Renier Snieders.

Bibliography
 De arme schoolmeester (1851)
 De gasthuisnon (1855)
 Op den toren (1869)
 Oud speelgoed (1878)
 Alleen in de wereld (1880)
 De nachtraven (1884)
 Fata morgana (1887)
 Dit sijn Snideriën (1893)

See also
 Flemish literature

Sources
 G.J. van Bork en , De Nederlandse en Vlaamse auteurs (1985).

1825 births
1904 deaths
Flemish writers
Flemish activists